Amendments to the Constitution of Ireland are only possible by way of referendum. A proposal to amend the Constitution of Ireland must first be approved by both Houses of the Oireachtas (parliament), then submitted to a referendum, and finally signed into law by the President of Ireland. Since the constitution entered into force on 29 December 1937, there have been 32 amendments to the constitution.

Aside from amendments to the Constitution itself, the Constitution also provides for referendums on ordinary bills; this is known as an ordinary referendum. This provision has never been used.

Procedure for amendment of the Constitution

Referendum
The procedure for amending the constitution is specified in Article 46. A proposed amendment must take the form of a bill to amend the constitution originating in Dáil Éireann (lower house of the Oireachtas). It must first be formally approved by both the Dáil and the Seanad, although in practice the Seanad has only the power to delay an amendment adopted by the Dáil. The Third Amendment of the Constitution Bill 1958, a proposal to alter the voting system, was delayed by the Seanad.

The amendment must then be endorsed by the electorate in a referendum. A simple majority of votes cast is sufficient to carry an amendment, with no minimum turnout required for a constitutional referendum to be considered valid. The vote is conducted by secret ballot. A proposal to amend the constitution put to a referendum must not contain any other proposal. While British citizens resident in the state may vote in a general election, only Irish citizens can participate in a referendum.

After the referendum
Anyone wishing to challenge the results of the referendum then has seven days to apply to the High Court for leave to present a referendum petition. If no one makes such an application, if leave is not granted, or if a petition is dismissed the referendum certificate becomes final.

When the referendum passed and the final certificate has issued, the amendment must be signed into law by the President "forthwith". Provided that the correct procedure has been complied with, the President cannot veto an amendment. The dates given for the amendments listed in this article are, unless otherwise stated, the dates on which they were signed into law. The shortest gap between the referendum and signing into law was twelve days for the 18th, 19th and 20th amendments. The longest was 899 days for the 31st amendment. No referendum has ever been annulled by the courts.

Transitional and conditional amendments
The Nineteenth Amendment, passed in May 1998, introduced a novel method of amendment. Its provisions allowed the later amendment to Articles 2 and 3 of the Constitution in 1999. The Nineteenth Amendment did not itself amend those articles, but rather introduced a temporary special mechanism by which the Government could order their amendment once it was satisfied that certain commitments made by other parties to the Good Friday Agreement had been complied with. The sections added to the text of the Constitution which provided for this later amendment to Articles no longer appear in the published official text of the Constitution, in line with their own provisions.

A similar method would have been used with the Twenty-fifth Amendment of the Constitution Bill 2001 to restrict abortion, which was rejected. The proposed Thirty-second Amendment of the Constitution Bill 2013 to abolish Seanad Éireann involved later amendments which would have taken effect after the next general election.

The Thirty-third Amendment that established the Court of Appeal had amendments which became part of the text only on the later establishment of the Court, and transitory provisions which would not appear in later printed official versions.

Historical methods
As a transitional measure, for the first three years after the election of the first President of Ireland a bill to amend the Constitution could be passed by the Oireachtas as an ordinary act. An amendment bill before the election of the first President (on 25 June 1938) would have required a referendum. To prevent the Oireachtas abusing this provision, the President had the power to refer such a bill to the people. The First and Second Amendments were adopted in this way; President Douglas Hyde chose to sign each into law without referendum. The three-year limit was entrenched to prevent it being extended without referendum. Since 25 June 1941, the third anniversary of President Hyde's election, every amendment has had to be put to a referendum after its passage through the Oireachtas.

List of amendments and referendums
The following table lists all amendments to the Constitution, and all past referendums relating to the Constitution. In general it does not list proposed amendments which failed to be passed by the Oireachtas, for which see the separate list of failed amendments to the Constitution of Ireland. The exception is the 2001 Twenty-second Amendment Bill, listed below to explain the gap in the numbering of subsequent amendments.

Color key:
 
 

Note

Referendums affecting court decisions

Rights of defendants and trial rights
In People (AG) v. O'Callaghan (1966), the Supreme Court held that the right to liberty would permit the denial of bail in limited circumstances only, where there was sufficient evidence before the Court that the accused was likely to interfere with the course of justice; specifically, that bail could not be because of the likelihood of the commission of further offences while on bail. This decision was overturned by the Sixteenth Amendment in 1996 which inserted Article 40.4.7º, allowing for the refusal of bail by a court to a person charged with a serious offence where it is reasonably considered necessary to prevent the commission of a serious offence by that person. The Amendment was passed by 75% to 25%.

In Maguire v. Ardagh (2002), the Supreme Court held that Oireachtas Inquiries did not have the power to compel witnesses to attend and to make findings against them. The Thirtieth Amendment of the Constitution Bill 2011 proposed to allow Oireachtas Inquiries to make findings of fact and to balance the rights of the individual against the public interest; this referendum was defeated by 53% to 47%.

Electoral matters
In O'Donovan v. the Attorney-General (1961), the Supreme Court held that the Electoral Amendment Act 1959 was unconstitutional and suggested that the ratio of representation to population across constituencies should differ by no more than 5%. The Third Amendment of the Constitution Bill 1968 would have allowed a variation of up to 16.7% across constituencies. It was rejected in a referendum by 61% to 39%.

In Re Article 26 and the Electoral (Amendment) Bill 1983 (1984), the Supreme Court held that the proposed bill to extend voting rights in Dáil elections to British citizens was unconstitutional. The Ninth Amendment was passed in June 1984, which allowed the franchise to be extended beyond Irish citizens.

International sovereignty
The Third Amendment, passed in 1972, allowed Ireland to accede to the European Communities. In 1986, the government signed the Single European Act (SEA). However, Raymond Crotty sought an injunction against ratification by the state. In Crotty v. An Taoiseach (1987), the Supreme Court held that the further transfer of powers from the state to the European institutions within the SEA was not "necessitated by the obligations of membership of the Communities" as provided for by the Third Amendment. Consequently, the Constitution required further amendment, before the SEA could be ratified. This was done in a referendum later in 1987. On the same basis, further referendums on European Treaties were held on the Maastricht Treaty (in 1992), on the Amsterdam Treaty (in 1998), on the Nice Treaty (in 2001 and in 2002), and on the Lisbon Treaty (in 2008 and in 2009). Referendums were also held to the allow the State to be bound by the Good Friday Agreement in 1998, and to ratify the International Criminal Court in 2001 and the Stability Treaty in 2012.

Abortion

In McGee v. The Attorney General (1974), the Supreme Court found that provisions of Articles 40 and 41 guaranteed a right to marital privacy, and that contraception on prescription could not be prohibited to a married couple. In Griswold v. Connecticut (1965), the United States Supreme Court came to a similar result, before finding for a general right to abortion in the first trimester in Roe v. Wade (1973). The Eighth Amendment in 1983 gave constitutional protection to the life of the unborn, and therefore prohibiting abortion. This had been partly to guard against the Supreme Court finding the same right that their American counterparts had.

In March 1992, the Supreme Court ruled in Attorney General v. X, commonly known as the "X Case", that a teenage girl was entitled to an abortion as there was a risk to her life from suicide. Opponents of abortion feared that this ruling could only be enforced in a way that would lead to an expansive abortion regime of the kind found in many other countries. There were two failed amendments that would have excluded suicide as grounds for abortion, the Twelfth Amendment of the Constitution Bill 1992 and the Twenty-fifth Amendment of the Constitution Bill 2001. The Protection of Life During Pregnancy Act 2013 made provisions for the finding of the court in the X Case, allowing abortion where the life of the woman was at risk, including a risk of suicide.

The Thirteenth Amendment was passed in 1992, to guarantee a right to travel. This addressed the injunction which the High Court had granted in the X Case to order the return of the girl to the country. Though the injunction was lifted by the Supreme Court, a majority of the Court had found that were it not for the risk to life of the defendant, an injunction would have been maintained.

The Fourteenth Amendment was passed on the same day in 1992, to guarantee that the ban on abortion would not limit freedom to obtain or make available information relating to services lawfully available in another state. This was in response to two cases: Attorney General (Society for the Protection of Unborn Children (Ireland) Ltd.) v Open Door Counselling Ltd. and Dublin Wellwoman Centre Ltd. (1988), which granted an injunction restraining two counseling agencies from assisting women to travel abroad to obtain abortions or informing them of the methods of communications with such clinics, and Society for the Protection of Unborn Children (Ireland) Ltd. v Grogan (1989), which placed an injunction restraining three students' unions from distributing information in relation to abortion available outside the state.

The Eighth Amendment was repealed in 2018 with the passage of the Thirty-sixth Amendment, thus allowing abortion to be legalised again.

Proposed amendments
The following bills are on the order paper for consideration in the Oireachtas.

Amendments to previous constitutions
Ireland had two previous Constitutions, prior to the adoption of the Constitution of Ireland: the Dáil Constitution of the short-lived 1919–1922 Irish Republic, and the constitution of the 1922–1937 Irish Free State.

The Dáil Constitution was enacted by Dáil Éireann (which was at that time a single chamber assembly).

The Constitution of the Irish Free State was adopted in October 1922 and came in force on 6 December 1922. It originally provided for a process of amendment by means of a referendum. However the constitution could initially be amended by the Oireachtas for eight years. The Oireachtas chose to extend that period, meaning that for the duration of its existence, the Free State constitution could be amended at will by parliament. By virtue of the 1922 Constitution Act, the constitution could not be amended in a way with conflicted with the Anglo-Irish Treaty of 1921 ratified by both the United Kingdom and the Irish Republic. However the Statute of Westminster removed that restriction in 1931 as far as British (but not Irish) law was concerned. It was amended 24 times between 1925 and 1936.

See also
Politics of the Republic of Ireland
Abortion in the Republic of Ireland
Constitutional amendment
Referendum Commission

External links
Official website of the Referendum Returning Officer – Includes an archive of referendum statistics.
The Unabridged Constitution of Ireland – This is an unofficial variorum edition with amendments alongside the original text. It is only accurate up until the Twentieth Amendment in 1999.
Irish Legal Information Initiative
Irish Statute Book online

References

Sources

Citations

 
Constitution of Ireland
Ireland
Amendments